Ceramic glaze, or simply glaze, is a glassy coating on ceramics. It is used for decoration, to ensure the item is impermeable to liquids and to minimise the adherence of pollutants.  

Glazing renders earthenware impermeable to water, sealing the inherent porosity of biscuit earthenware. It also gives a tougher surface. Glaze is also used on stoneware and porcelain. In addition to their functionality, glazes can form a variety of surface finishes, including degrees of glossy or matte finish and color. Glazes may also enhance the underlying design or texture either unmodified or inscribed, carved or painted.

Most pottery produced in recent centuries has been glazed, other than pieces in bisque porcelain, terracotta, or some other types. Tiles are often glazed on the surface face, and modern architectural terracotta is often glazed.  Glazed brick is also common. Sanitaryware is invariably glazed, as are many ceramics used in industry, for example ceramic insulators for overhead power lines.

The most important groups of traditional glazes, each named after its main ceramic fluxing agent, are:

Ash glaze, traditonally important in East Asia, simply made from wood or plant ash, which contains potash and lime. 
Feldspathic glazes of porcelain.
They have been used for about 2,000 years in China e.g. sancai, around the Mediterranean, and in Europe e.g. Victorian majolica.
Salt-glaze, mostly European stoneware. It uses ordinary salt.
Tin-glaze, which coats the ware with lead glaze made opaque white by the addition of tin. Known in the Ancient Near East and then important in Islamic pottery, from which it passed to Europe. Includes Hispano-Moresque ware, Italian Renaissance maiolica (also called majolica), faience and Delftware.

Glaze may be applied by spraying, dipping, trailing or brushing on an aqueous suspension of the unfired glaze. The colour of a glaze after it has been fired may be significantly different from before firing. To prevent glazed wares sticking to kiln furniture during firing, either a small part of the object being fired (for example, the foot) is left unglazed or, alternatively, special refractory "spurs" are used as supports. These are removed and discarded after the firing.

Modern materials technology has invented new glazes that do not necessarily conform to these traditional categories.

History
Historically, glazing of ceramics developed rather slowly, as appropriate materials needed to be discovered, and also firing technology able to reliably reach the necessary temperatures was needed.  Glazes first appeared on stone materials in the 4th millennium BC, and Ancient Egyptian faience (fritware rather than a clay-based material) was self-glazing, as the material naturally formed a glaze-like layer during firing.  Glazing of pottery followed the invention of glass around 1500 BC, in the Middle East and Egypt with alkali glazes including ash glaze, and in China, using ground feldspar. By around 100 BC lead-glazing was widespread in the Old World.

Glazed brick goes back to the Elamite Temple at Chogha Zanbil, dated to the 13th century BC.  The Iron Pagoda, built in 1049 in Kaifeng, China, of glazed bricks is a well-known later example.

Lead glazed earthenware was probably made in China during the Warring States Period (475 – 221 BCE), and its production increased during the Han Dynasty. High temperature proto-celadon glazed stoneware was made earlier than glazed earthenware, since the Shang Dynasty (1600 – 1046 BCE).

During the Kofun period of Japan, Sue ware was decorated with greenish natural ash glazes. From 552 to 794 AD, differently colored glazes were introduced. The three colored glazes of the Tang Dynasty were frequently used for a period, but were gradually phased out; the precise colors and compositions of the glazes have not been recovered. Natural ash glaze, however, was commonly used throughout the country.

In the 13th century, flower designs were painted with red, blue, green, yellow and black overglazes. Overglazes became very popular because of the particular look they gave ceramics.

From the eighth century, the use of glazed ceramics was prevalent in Islamic art and Islamic pottery, usually in the form of elaborate pottery. Tin-opacified glazing was one of the earliest new technologies developed by the Islamic potters. The first Islamic opaque glazes can be found as blue-painted ware in Basra, dating to around the 8th century. Another significant contribution was the development of stoneware, originating from 9th century Iraq. Other places for innovative pottery in the Islamic world included Fustat (from 975 to 1075), Damascus (from 1100 to around 1600) and Tabriz (from 1470 to 1550).

Composition
Glazes need to include a ceramic flux which functions by promoting partial liquefaction in the clay bodies and the other glaze materials. Fluxes lower the high melting point of the glass forms silica, and sometimes boron trioxide.  These glass forms may be included in the glaze materials, or may be drawn from the clay beneath. 
 
Raw materials for ceramic glazes generally include silica, which will be the main glass former. Various metal oxides, such as those of sodium, potassium and calcium, act as flux and therefore lower the melting temperature. Alumina, often derived from clay, stiffens the molten glaze to prevent it from running off the piece. Colorants, such as iron oxide, copper carbonate or cobalt carbonate, and sometimes opacifiers including tin oxide and zirconium oxide, are used to modify the visual appearance of the fired glaze.

Process

Glaze may be applied by dry-dusting a dry mixture over the surface of the clay body or by inserting salt or soda into the kiln at high temperatures to create an atmosphere rich in sodium vapor that interacts with the aluminium and silica oxides in the body to form and deposit glass, producing what is known as salt glaze pottery. Most commonly, glazes in aqueous suspension of various powdered minerals and metal oxides are applied by dipping pieces directly into the glaze. Other techniques include pouring the glaze over the piece, spraying it onto the piece with an airbrush or similar tool, or applying it directly with a brush or other tool.

To prevent the glazed article from sticking to the kiln during firing, either a small part of the item is left unglazed, or it is supported on small refractory supports such as kiln spurs and stilts that are removed and discarded after the firing. Small marks left by these spurs are sometimes visible on finished ware.

Colour and decoration
Underglaze decoration is applied before the glaze, usually to unfired pottery ("raw" or "greenware") but sometimes to "biscuit"-fired (an initial firing of some articles before the glazing and re-firing). A wet glaze—usually transparent—is applied over the decoration. The pigment fuses with the glaze, and appears to be underneath a layer of clear glaze; generally the body material used fires to a whitish colour. The best known type of underglaze decoration is the blue and white porcelain first produced in China, and then copied in other countries. The striking blue color uses cobalt as cobalt oxide or cobalt carbonate.  However many of the imitative types, such as Delftware, have brownish earthenware bodies, which are given a white tin-glaze and either inglaze or overglaze decoration.  With the English invention of creamware and other white-bodied earthenwares in the 18th century, underglaze decoration became widely used on earthenware as well as porcelain.

Overglaze decoration is applied on top of a fired layer of glaze, and generally uses colours in "enamel", essentially glass, which require a second firing at a relatively low temperature to fuse them with the glaze.  Because it is only fired at a relatively low temperature, a wider range of pigments could be used in historic periods.  Overglaze colors are low-temperature glazes that give ceramics a more decorative, glassy look. A piece is fired first, this initial firing being called the glost firing, then the overglaze decoration is applied, and it is fired again. Once the piece is fired and comes out of the kiln, its texture is smoother due to the glaze.

Other methods are firstly inglaze, where the paints are applied onto the glaze before firing, and then become incorporated within the glaze layer during firing.  This works well with tin-glazed pottery, such as maiolica, but the range of colours was limited to those that could withstand a glost firing, as with underglaze.  Coloured glazes, where the pigments are mixed into the liquid glaze before it is applied to the pottery, are mostly used to give a single colour to a whole piece, as in most celadons, but can also be used to create designs in contrasting colours, as in Chinese sancai ("three-colour") wares, or even painted scenes.

Many historical styles, for example Japanese Imari ware, Chinese doucai and wucai, combine the different types of decoration.  In such cases the first firing for the body, any underglaze decoration and glaze is typically followed by a second firing after the overglaze enamels have been applied.

Environmental impact

Heavy metals are dense metals used in glazes to produce a particular color or texture. Glaze components are more likely to be leached into the environment when non-recycled ceramic products are exposed to warm or acidic water. Leaching of heavy metals occurs when ceramic products are glazed incorrectly or damaged.   Lead and chromium are two heavy metals which can be used in ceramic glazes that are heavily monitored by government agencies due to their toxicity and ability to bioaccumulate.

Metal oxide chemistry 
Metals used in ceramic glazes are typically in the form of metal oxides.

Lead(II) oxide 
Ceramic manufacturers primarily use lead(II) oxide (PbO) as a flux for its low melting range, wide firing range, low surface tension, high index of refraction, and resistance to devitrification. Lead used in the manufacture of commercial glazes are molecularly bound to silica in a 1:1 ratio, or included in frit form, to ensure stabilization and reduce the risk of leaching. 

In polluted environments, nitrogen dioxide reacts with water to produce nitrous acid and nitric acid.

 + 2 →  + 

Soluble Lead(II) nitrate forms when lead(II) oxide (PbO) of leaded glazes is exposed to nitric acid

PbO + 2 →  + 

Because lead exposure is strongly linked to a variety of health problems, collectively referred to as lead poisoning, the disposal of leaded glass (chiefly in the form of discarded CRT displays) and lead-glazed ceramics is subject to toxic waste regulations.

Barium carbonate and Strontium carbonate 
Barium carbonate (BaCO3) is used to create a unique glaze color known as barium blue. However, the ethical nature of using barium carbonate for glazes on food contact surfaces has come into question. Barium poisoning by ingestion can result in convulsions, paralysis, digestive discomfort, and death. It is also somewhat soluble in acid, and can contaminate water and soil for long periods of time. These concerns have led to attempts to substitute Strontium carbonate (SrCO3) in glazes that require barium carbonate. Unlike Barium carbonate, Strontium carbonate is not considered a safety hazard by the NIH. Experiments in strontium substitution tend to be successful in gloss type glazes, although there are some effects and colors produced in matte type glazes that can only be obtained through use of barium. 

To reduce the likelihood of leaching, barium carbonate is used in frit form and bound to silica in a 1:1 ratio. It is also recommended that barium glazes not be used on food contact surfaces or outdoor items.

Chromium(III) oxide 
Chromium(III) oxide is used as a colorant in ceramic glazes. Chromium(III) oxide can undergo a reaction with calcium oxide (CaO) and atmospheric oxygen in temperatures reached by a kiln to produce calcium chromate. The oxidation reaction changes chromium from its +3 oxidation state to its +6 oxidation state. Chromium(VI) is very soluble and the most mobile out of all the other stable forms of chromium.

 + 2CaO +  → 

Chromium may enter water systems via industrial discharge. Chromium(VI) can enter the environment directly or oxidants present in soils can react with chromium(III) to produce chromium(VI). Plants have reduced amounts of chlorophyll when grown in the presence of chromium(VI).

Uranium(IV) oxide (UO2)

Urania-based ceramic glazes are dark green or black when fired in a reduction or when UO2 is used; more commonly it is used in oxidation to produce bright yellow, orange and red glazes Uranium glazes were used in the 1920s and 1930s for making uranium tile, watch, clock and aircraft dials.

Uranium dioxide is produced by reducing uranium trioxide with hydrogen.

 UO3 + H2 → UO2 + H2O at 700 °C (973 K)

Prevention 
Chromium oxidation during manufacturing processes can be reduced with the introduction of compounds that bind to calcium. Ceramic industries are reluctant to use lead alternatives since leaded glazes provide products with a brilliant shine and smooth surface. The United States Environmental Protection Agency has experimented with a dual glaze, barium alternative to lead, but they were unsuccessful in achieving the same optical effect as leaded glazes.

Gallery

See also

 Celadon
 Frit
 Glaze defects
 Pottery#Glazing and firing techniques
 Shino ware
 Swatow ware
 Uranium tile
 Vitreous enamel

References

Bibliography

Painting techniques
Artistic techniques
Pottery
Glass applications
Glass compositions
Ceramic glazes
Ceramic engineering